Grattai is a locality in New South Wales, Australia.
One notable character of the area is the famous Michael James Cleary A.K.A "Mad Mudgee Mick".

References

Localities in New South Wales
Towns in the Central West (New South Wales)